Comperiella is a genus of parasitic wasps in the family Encyrtidae, containing around 10 species.
 Comperiella apoda
 Comperiella aspidiotiphaga
 Comperiella bifasciata
 Comperiella calauanica
 Comperiella diversifasciata
 Comperiella indica
 Comperiella karoo
 Comperiella lemniscata
 Comperiella pia
 Comperiella ponticula 
 Comperiella unifasciata

References

Encyrtidae